Mainstream Rock is a music chart in Billboard magazine that ranks the most-played songs on mainstream rock radio stations in the United States, a category that combines the formats of active rock and heritage rock. The chart was launched in March 1981 as Rock Albums & Top Tracks, after which the name changed first to Top Rock Tracks, then to Album Rock Tracks, and finally to its current Mainstream Rock in 1996.

History
The Rock Albums & Top Tracks charts were introduced in the March 21, 1981, issue of Billboard. The 50- and 60-position charts ranked airplay on album rock radio stations in the United States. Because album-oriented rock stations focused on playing tracks from albums rather than specifically released singles, these charts were designed to measure the airplay of any and all tracks from an album. Rock Albums was a survey of the top albums on American rock radio, while Top Tracks listed the top individual songs being played. Mike Harrison of Billboard explained that when major artists release albums, more than one song from the album can become popular at the same time. The first number-one song on the Top Tracks chart was "I Can't Stand It" by Eric Clapton.

On September 15, 1984, the Rock Albums chart was discontinued and Top Tracks was renamed Top Rock Tracks. It reduced from a 60-song tally to 50 songs on October 20, 1984, following a major revamp to the magazine. Coinciding with an increase in its reporting panel of album rock stations in the United States, the name of the chart was changed again with the issue dated April 12, 1986, to Album Rock Tracks. On November 23, 1991, instead of reporting panels, Billboard changed its methodology of measuring airplay by using monitored airplay as provided by Nielsen Broadcast Data Systems to compile many of its charts.  As a result, this data showed that many songs could spend months to over a year on the Album Rock Tracks chart. Billboard decided to drop to a 40-position chart on the week of June 27, 1992 (still its current format), and songs that fell out of the top 20 and after spending 20 weeks on the chart were moved to a new 10-position recurrent chart. The recurrent chart was scrapped two years later, but not the methodology.

To differentiate between classic and alternative album rock radio formats, Billboard changed the name of the chart to Mainstream Rock Tracks beginning with issue dated April 13, 1996. The Mainstream Rock Tracks chart did not appear in the print edition of Billboard from its issue dated August 2, 2003, being accessible only through the magazine's subscription-based website, Billboard.biz. In late 2013, the chart was reintroduced to its primary website and magazine.

When R&R ceased publication in June 2009, Billboard incorporated its rock charts, Active Rock and Heritage Rock into its own publication. The radio station reporters of the two charts combine to make up the Mainstream Rock chart. In the United States, Active rock stations concentrate on current hits over classic rock standards while heritage rock stations put a greater emphasis on classic rock with a few newer tracks mixed in. The individual Active Rock and Heritage Rock components were discontinued by Billboard at the end of November 2013 due to a growing lack of difference between the two charts.

To celebrate the 40th anniversary of the chart, in June 2021, Billboard released two charts ranking the top songs and artists in the history of the chart. "Touch, Peel and Stand" by Days of the New was the number-one song on the Greatest of All Time Mainstream Rock Songs and Shinedown was named the number-one artist on the ranking of Greatest of All Time Mainstream Rock Artists.
The current number one song is "Lost" by Linkin Park

Chart achievements

Artists with the most number-one songs
These are the artists with at least 8 songs that topped the Mainstream Rock chart.

Artists with the most consecutive number-one songs

Artists with the most cumulative weeks at number one

Artists with the most top-ten songs

Artists with the most charted songs

Songs with the most weeks on the chart
These are the songs that have spent at least one year (52 weeks) on the Mainstream Rock chart.

Songs with ten or more weeks at number one

References

External links
 Current Billboard Mainstream Rock chart

Billboard charts